The Lewisburg micropolitan area may refer to:

The Lewisburg, Pennsylvania micropolitan area, United States
The Lewisburg, Tennessee micropolitan area, United States

See also
Lewisburg (disambiguation)